Lesser star coral may refer to two different species of coral:

 Goniastrea favulus, a species of coral in the family Merulinidae
 Paragoniastrea australensis, a species of coral in the family Merulinidae